Deborah-Anne de la Harpe (born 5 April 2000) is a footballer who plays for W-League club Perth Glory FC. She has represented Australia (where she was born) and the Republic of Ireland at under-19 and senior levels, respectively.

Club career

Perth Glory FC, 2020–  
In December 2020, De la Harpe joined Perth Glory for the 2020–21 W-League season. She started in all twelve matches for the club. Perth Glory finished in last place with a  record. In May 2021, she re-signed with the club for the 2021–22 W-League season.

International career
In 2018, De La Harpe was named to the Junior Matildas squad to compete at the 2019 AFC U-16 Qualifiers. In 2019, she competed at the 2019 AFC U-19 Women's Championship. 

In 2023, she was included in Vera Pauw's Republic of Ireland squad, qualifying through her County Antrim born mother, ahead of upcoming friendlies.

References

External links
 Profile  at Perth Glory FC
 Profile at ESPN

2000 births
Living people
Perth Glory FC (A-League Women) players
Australian women's soccer players
A-League Women players
Women's association football defenders
Republic of Ireland women's international footballers